BabyMonster (stylized in all caps), also known as Baemon, is an upcoming South Korean girl group formed by YG Entertainment. Consisting of seven members—Ruka, Pharita, Asa, Ahyeon, Haram, Rora, and Chiquita—they are scheduled to debut in 2023.

History

2018–2022: Formation and pre-debut activities
Following the launch of YG Entertainment's representative girl groups 2NE1 (2009) and Blackpink (2016), news of the label's next girl group circulated as early as 2018. They received applicants from various countries, some of whom were accepted into its training program as early as age 10, training an average of four to five years. In the number of recruits, each prospective member placed first against thousands in their respective auditions. In January 2020, the written forms of "BabyMonster", one of many names initially considered for Blackpink, and "Baemon" (a syllabic abbreviation of the former) were trademarked in English and Korean by the label and tentatively used by media outlets until the eventual disclosure of their official uses. The group's formation was finalized with three South Korean (Ahyeon, Haram, Rora), two Japanese (Ruka, Asa), and two Thai members (Pharita, Chiquita).

Several members held prior experience in the entertainment industry ahead of their acceptance into YG Entertainment. Haram started as a child model at age two, Ruka and Rora debuted as founding members of the Japanese girl group  (2017) and the children's music group U.SSO Girl (2017) with Hyein of NewJeans respectively, and Pharita modelled in contests and auditioned for the survival reality program Idol Paradise (2021). Ruka trained the longest of the seven, preceding Asa and Haram who auditioned in 2018, Rora in May 2018, and Ahyeon in December 2018. Pharita was chosen out of 1,226 applicants amidst her audition in July 2020, and Chiquita trained the shortest of the septet and became its final member after three months of training since her recruit in 2021. In the midst of training, vocals from the members were revealed to be recorded in the final chorus of the lead single, "Iyah" (아이야; aiya) by labelmate Kang Seung-yoon.

2023: Introduction and Last Evaluation
YG Entertainment signaled the septet's formal introduction on December 30, 2022 with a poster and the subtext "YG Next Movement". It heralded a short video posted on YouTube on New Year's Day that garnered 15 million views in three days, and featured appearances by members of Winner and Blackpink, sibling duo AKMU, dancer and choreographer Leejung Lee, and label founder Yang Hyun-suk. BabyMonster's introduction, together with the announcement of G-Dragon's feasible return as a soloist that same day, contributed to a subsequent rise in the label's stocks, peaking at 11.74%. The seven members were revealed to the public through gradual releases of live performance videos starting on January 12 (in order: Haram, Ahyeon, Chiquita, Asa, Rora, Pharita, and Ruka). BabyMonster's YouTube channel soon surpassed one million subscribers in 52 days since its creation on December 28, 2022, indicating growth ahead of their debut. On March 5, YG Entertainment unveiled a trailer for a web show entitled Last Evaluation, chronicling the group's formation, which premiered on March 10.

Public image
Created with a "high-teen" image different from the label's prior female acts, the septet maintains the signature charismatic elements of YG Entertainment. BabyMonster was touted as an "all-rounder" group with its members labelled as "elites" by the public and media alike, wherein each excel in vocals, rap, and dance. The ensemble is also known to be proficient in various languages including Korean, English, Japanese, Thai, and Chinese. 

In a survey conducted by entertainment business magazine JoyNews24, two hundred industry workers from entertainment companies and broadcasters, film and broadcast content producers, and entertainment reporters ranked the tentative group ninth in the "Most Anticipated Artist of Late 2021 and 2022", tied with Ive amidst others.

Members

 Ruka
 Pharita
 Asa
 Ahyeon
 Haram
 Rora
 Chiquita

Filmography 

 Last Evaluation (2023, YouTube)

References

K-pop music groups
Musical groups established in 2023
South Korean girl groups
Musical groups from Seoul
YG Entertainment artists
2023 establishments in South Korea